The 2008 MAC Championship Game was played on December 5, 2008 at Ford Field in Detroit, Michigan. The game featured the winner of each division of the Mid-American Conference. The game featured the Ball State Cardinals, of the West Division, and the Buffalo Bulls, of the East Division. The Buffalo Bulls upset the #12-ranked Ball State 42–24, ending hopes of an undefeated Cardinals season.

This was not the first time these two conference rivals have met. They met 5 times previously before this big Championship Game, with Ball State leading the series 5-0. Against the odds Buffalo faced the undefeated Cardinals and came out victorious in this matchup.

Selection process
The MAC Championship Game matches up the winner of the East and West divisions of the Mid-American Conference.

With the Buffalo Bulls having 24 upperclassmen, it made the task of knocking off the undefeated and top of the conference Ball State Cardinals more of a realistic venture.

Scoring summary

Starting lineups
Source:

References

Championship Game
MAC Championship Game
Ball State Cardinals football games
Buffalo Bulls football games
American football competitions in Detroit
December 2008 sports events in the United States
MAC Championship
2008 in Detroit